The World Geographical Scheme for Recording Plant Distributions (WGSRPD) is a biogeographical system developed by the international Biodiversity Information Standards (TDWG) organization, formerly the International Working Group on Taxonomic Databases. The system provides clear definitions and codes for recording plant distributions at four scales or levels, from "botanical continents" down to parts of large countries. Current users of the system include the International Union for Conservation of Nature (IUCN), the Germplasm Resources Information Network (GRIN), and the World Checklist of Selected Plant Families (WCSP). Plants of the World Online uses Kew's data sources, and hence also uses the WGSRPD for distributions.

Codes
The table is arranged in the systematic order used in the WGSRPD. The levels used in the scheme are:
 Nine botanical continents; the code consists of a single digit
 Regions – each botanical continent is divided into between two and ten sub-continental regions; a two-digit code is used for regions, in which the first digit is the continent
 Areas or "botanical countries" – most regions are subdivided into units, generally equating to a political country, but large countries may be split or outlying areas omitted; a three-letter code is used for areas
 "Basic recording units" – the lowest level is only used for very large "botanical countries", subdividing them into states, provinces or islands on purely political grounds; the full code is made up of a two-letter code appended to the corresponding area code

See also 
Biogeography
Phytochorion
Phytogeography
Wikipedia categories for flora distributions using the World Geographical Scheme for Recording Plant Distributions
Flora categories with a WGSRPD code

References

External links 

Biogeography
World Geographical Scheme for Recording Plant Distributions